Captain Cove is a cove located within the traditional territory of the Gitxaala Nation, on Pitt Island, British Columbia, Canada. It was named after Captain Holmes Newcombe of the Fisheries Department.

The cove is underlain by the large  Captain Cove Pluton dating to the Albian (109±6Ma).

The cove preserves a record of intense prehistoric use, with a few large shell middens and several small shell middens associated with creeks flowing into the cove.

References

North Coast of British Columbia
Coves of Canada